Saint Gabriel's College, is a Church of England co-educational secondary school located in the London Borough of Lambeth.

History
Saint Gabriel's, which developed out of Charles Edward Brooke School, opened as a Specialist Arts and Music College in September 2012. The college moved to its present site in October 2018. The college maintains strong links with the Church. In 2019 the vicar of the Church is serving on the college governing body as the Vice-Chair of Governors.

Admissions
Saint Gabriel's College is an 11-16 voluntary aided, co-educational comprehensive school, part of the educational provision of the Anglican Diocese of Southwark and the London Borough of Lambeth.

References

Secondary schools in the London Borough of Lambeth
Church of England secondary schools in the Diocese of Southwark
Voluntary aided schools in London